Gerald Wayne VandeWalle (born August 15, 1933) is an American lawyer who served as a justice of the North Dakota Supreme Court from 1978 to 2023. He served as the court's chief justice from 1993 to 2019.

Early life and education
VandeWalle was born in Noonan, North Dakota and graduated from the University of North Dakota in 1955 with a Bachelor of Science degree in commerce. While attending the University of North Dakota he joined the Lambda Chi Alpha fraternity. He then received a Juris Doctor from the University of North Dakota School of Law in 1958.

Career
In late 2019, VandeWalle announced he would not seek reelection for another term as chief justice, but would remain on the court. He was the longest-serving chief justice in North Dakota history and at the time, the oldest in the nation. He retired from the court on January 31, 2023.

Career
 1958 – admitted to the State Bar of North Dakota
 1975 – appointed First Assistant Attorney General of North Dakota
 August, 1978 – appointed to the North Dakota Supreme Court
 November, 1978 – elected to serve an unexpired term on Supreme Court
 1985–1987 – served as the first chair of the North Dakota Judicial Conference
 1993 – elected Chief Justice of North Dakota Supreme Court
 1995 – re-elected Chief Justice
 2000 – re-elected Chief Justice
 2005—re-elected Chief Justice
 2010—re-elected Chief Justice
 2015—re-elected Chief Justice

References

External links
 Gerald W. VandeWalle biography

1933 births
Living people
20th-century American judges
21st-century American judges
Chief Justices of the North Dakota Supreme Court
Justices of the North Dakota Supreme Court
People from Divide County, North Dakota
University of North Dakota alumni